The Breakthrough Prize in Fundamental Physics is one of the Breakthrough Prizes, awarded by the Breakthrough Prize Board. Initially named Fundamental Physics Prize, it was founded in July 2012 by Russia-born Israeli entrepreneur, venture capitalist and physicist Yuri Milner. The prize is awarded to physicists from theoretical, mathematical, or experimental physics that have made transformative contributions to fundamental physics, and specifically for recent advances.

Worth USD$3 million, the prize is the most lucrative physics prize in the world and is more than twice the amount given to the Nobel Prize awardees.

Unlike the annual Breakthrough Prize in Fundamental Physics, the Special Breakthrough Prize is not limited to recent discoveries, while the prize money is still USD$3 million.

Physics Frontiers Prize has only been awarded for 2 years. Laureates are automatically nominated for next year's Breakthrough Prize in Fundamental Physics. If they are not awarded the prize the next year, they will each receive USD$300,000 and be automatically nominated for the Breakthrough Prize in Fundamental Physics in the next 5 years.

Laureates 
The following is a listing of the laureates, by year (including Special Prize winners).

New Horizons in Physics Prize
The New Horizons in Physics Prize, awarded to promising junior researchers, carries an award of $100,000.

Trophy

The Fundamental Physics Prize trophy, a work of art created by Danish-Icelandic artist Olafur Eliasson,  is a silver sphere with a coiled vortex inside. The form is a toroid, or doughnut shape, resulting from two sets of intertwining three-dimensional spirals. Found in nature, these spirals are seen in animal horns, nautilus shells, whirlpools, and even galaxies and black holes.

Ceremony
The name of the 2013 prize winner was unveiled at the culmination of a ceremony which took place on the evening of March 20, 2013 at the Geneva International Conference Centre. The ceremony was hosted by Hollywood actor and science enthusiast Morgan Freeman. The evening honored the 2013 laureates − 16 outstanding scientists including Stephen Hawking and CERN scientists who led the decades-long effort to discover the Higgs-like particle at the Large Hadron Collider. Sarah Brightman and Russian pianist Denis Matsuev performed for the guests of the ceremony.

Criticism
Some have expressed reservations about such new science mega-prizes.

See also
 Breakthrough Prize in Life Sciences
 Breakthrough Prize in Mathematics
 List of physics awards

References

External links
 

Academic awards
Awards established in 2012
International awards
Physics awards
Physics organizations
Russian science and technology awards
Yuri Milner